Tambrahalli Subramanya Satyanarayana Iyer, popularly known T. S. Satyan (18 December 1923 – 13 December 2009) was an Indian photojournalist

Background 
Satyan was born and educated in Mysore. He studied at the city's Banumaiah school and gained his Bachelor of Arts degree from Maharaja College. In 2004 he

Professional career
Satyan began his journalism career with a state English daily and worked for The Illustrated Weekly before quitting the profession to become a freelancer and take up the assignments of UNICEF. He began working for WHO as a freelance photojournalist in the early 1960s. From 1961 to 1963, he worked with the WHO Regional Office in South-East Asia to produce several photo reports on health work in India. He photographed WHO's smallpox eradication campaign as well as eye-care, nursing and school health programmes. His work was featured in several issues of the World Health magazine.

His images were regularly published in the Illustrated Weekly of India, Life, Time, India Today, Outlook, Deccan Herald and Newsweek.

Death 
Satyan died on 13 December 2009 after suffering a brain haemorrhage. He is survived by his wife Nagarathna, two sons and a daughter.

Awards and recognitions 
 Honorary Doctorate degree from Mysore University – 2004
 Awarded the Padma Shri – 1977
 An exhibition of his photographs sponsored by UNICEF at the United Nations headquarters in New York City to mark the International Year of the Child – 1979

Bibliography 

 Exploring Karnataka
 Hampi – the Fabled Capital of the Vijaynagar Empire
 In Love with Life
 Kalakke Kannada – his memoirs in Kannada
 Alive and Clicking

References 

1923 births
2009 deaths
Indian photojournalists
Kannada people
Kannada-language journalists
Recipients of the Padma Shri in literature & education
Maharaja's College, Mysore alumni
Writers from Mysore
Journalists from Karnataka
20th-century Indian journalists
Indian male journalists
20th-century Indian photographers
Photographers from Karnataka